William Clyde Hardiman III is an American Republican politician from Michigan. He was the mayor of Kentwood, Michigan from 1992 to 2002. He then ran for Michigan state senate in 2002 in the 29th district, defeating Steve Pestka, and served from 2003 to 2011, when he retired due to term limits. He ran unsuccessfully for Congress in Michigan's 3rd congressional district. In June 2011 he joined the Michigan Department of Human Services, where he focuses on services for veterans.

Hardiman is a veteran himself, having served in the United States Army in Vietnam during the Vietnam War as a medic in an artillery unit from 1967 to 1968. He also served with the Americal Division and became a Specialist 5.

He has an associate degree from Grand Rapids Community College, a bachelor's degree from Grand Valley State University, and a master's degree in public affairs from Western Michigan University.

Sources

Year of birth missing (living people)
Living people
21st-century African-American people
Combat medics
Republican Party Michigan state senators
Mayors of places in Michigan
Grand Valley State University alumni
Western Michigan University alumni
African-American mayors in Michigan
African-American state legislators in Michigan
Grand Rapids Community College alumni
People from Kentwood, Michigan
United States Army personnel of the Vietnam War
United States Army soldiers